Biała  is a village in Wieluń County, Łódź Voivodeship, in central Poland. It is the seat of the gmina (administrative district) called Gmina Biała.

The village has a population of 333.

References

Villages in Wieluń County
Kalisz Governorate
Łódź Voivodeship (1919–1939)